FK Orjen is a Montenegrin football club based in the town of Zelenika, Herceg Novi municipality. They play in the Montenegrin Third League - South Region.

History
Founded in 1924, named after Orjen mountain, FK Orjen is the oldest sports society in Herceg Novi municipality. Until 1941, the team played few seasons in the Montenegrin football championship.
From 1946 to 1975, the team participated under the name FK Polet. Best results, FK Orjen made in period from 1970 to 1992. In that period, the team won three titles in the Fourth League - South champion (1970, 1973, 1991). At the same time, Orjen won four titles of regional, amateur-teams Nikša Bućin Cup (1973, 1977, 1982, 1990).
FK Orjen played two years in the higher-ranked Montenegrin Republic League (third level of competition in SFR Yugoslavia), during the seasons 1973-74 and 1991-92.

After Montenegrin independence, FK Orjen became a member of the Montenegrin Third League.

Honours and achievements
 Montenegrin Fourth League – 3
winners (3): 1969–70, 1972–73, 1990–91

Stadium

FK Orjen's stadium is built at Opačica location, Zelenika hood, during 1972. Except Orjen home games, during the winter months, because of good climate and accommodation, stadium is used for exhibition matches, tournaments, trainings and preparations of many football teams from the region (Montenegro, Serbia, Macedonia, Albania, Kosovo, Bosnia and Herzegovina and Croatia).

See also
Herceg Novi
Montenegrin Third League
Montenegrin Regional Cups
Montenegrin clubs in Yugoslav football competitions (1946–2006)

External links
 Profile by Weltfussballarchiv

References

Football clubs in Montenegro
1924 establishments in Montenegro
Herceg Novi